Camil Inmaculada Domínguez Martínez (born 7 December 1991) is a Dominican Republic volleyball player. She plays for the Dominican Republic women's national volleyball team.

She participated in the 2015 FIVB Volleyball World Grand Prix.
With her club Mirador she competed at the 2015 FIVB Volleyball Women's Club World Championship.

References

1991 births
Living people
Dominican Republic women's volleyball players
Place of birth missing (living people)
Volleyball players at the 2015 Pan American Games
Pan American Games bronze medalists for the Dominican Republic
Pan American Games medalists in volleyball
Volleyball players at the 2019 Pan American Games
Medalists at the 2015 Pan American Games
Medalists at the 2019 Pan American Games
Volleyball players at the 2020 Summer Olympics
Olympic volleyball players of the Dominican Republic
21st-century Dominican Republic women